
Anyway Records is an independent record label based in Columbus, Ohio, which specializes in a Columbus brand of indie rock. It was established in 1991 by Bela Koe-Krompecher, called an "indie stalwart" by Entertainment Weekly.

During the 1990s, the label was considered the most well-known and prolific label in Columbus. The Other Paper called Anyway Records "arguably the most influential indie label in Columbus throughout the last half of the ‘90s." The early 2000s saw a reduction in offerings. However, since 2007, the label has put out records by The Whiles, The Kyle Sowashes, Moviola, and The Lindsay. "Song for Jerry", off of The Whiles album Colors of the Year, appeared on the documentary Murderball. The Whiles album Sleepers Wake was referred to by Columbus Alive as a "masterpiece."

Past releases have included notable artists such as Guided by Voices, the Ass Ponys, the New Bomb Turks, and Jenny Mae.

Current artists
Listed alphabetically
 Appalachian Death Ride
 Connections
 Ghost Shirt
 Kneeling In Piss
 The Kyle Sowashes
 The Lindsay
 Mary Lynn
 Moviola
 St. Lenox
 Thomas Jefferson Slave Apartments
 The Whiles
 Speaking Suns

See also 
 List of record labels: A–H

References

External links
 

American independent record labels
Record labels established in 1991
Indie rock record labels
Companies based in the Columbus, Ohio metropolitan area
1991 establishments in Ohio
Record labels based in Ohio